The East Indies are the lands of South (Indian subcontinent) and Southeast Asia.

East Indies may also refer to:
 Patriarchate of the East Indies, a Roman Catholic Church geographic division
 East Indie, a domestic ornamental breed of duck

See also

 Danish East Indies, former Danish colonies in India and the Nicobar Islands
 Dutch East Indies, a former Dutch colony, now Indonesia
 East India (disambiguation)
 East Indies and China Station
 East Indies and Egypt Seaplane Squadron
 East Indies Barrier, a WWII allied battle line
 East Indies campaign (disambiguation)
 East Indies Fleet, a WWII-era British Royal Navy fleet
 East Indies Station, the British Empire naval duty station India, including the East Indies Squadron
 Indies (disambiguation)
 Indo-Australian Archipelago
 South Asia 
 Southeast Asia
 Spanish East Indies, a former Spanish colony, now the Philippines and some other nearby lands
 West Indies
 West Indies (disambiguation)